The 2021 Preakness Stakes was the 146th Preakness Stakes, a Grade I stakes race for three-year-old Thoroughbreds at a distance of  miles (1.9 km). The race is one leg of the American Triple Crown and is held annually at Pimlico Race Course in Baltimore, Maryland. The Preakness Stakes is traditionally held on the third Saturday in May, two weeks after the Kentucky Derby. The 2021 Preakness took place on May 15 with an actual start time of 6:54 p.m. EDT, with television coverage by NBC. The race was won by Rombauer.

Background
Due to effects from the COVID-19 pandemic, the 2020 edition was run outside of its normal May schedule, contested as the final leg of the Triple Crown on October 3, without spectators. In late March 2021, organizers announced that attendance at the 2021 Preakness would be limited to 10,000. The 2021 Triple Crown races returned to their traditional sequence and schedule, with Medina Spirit winning the 2021 Kentucky Derby on May 1.

Field
Soon after the Derby, trainer Bob Baffert confirmed that Medina Spirit would be entered in the Preakness. However, it was later announced that Medina Spirit had tested positive for betamethasone, a corticosteroid, following the Derby, and stands to be disqualified if the split sample confirms the positive. Pimlico agreed to accept the entry of Medina Spirit on the condition that he undergo blood testing, monitoring, and a review of medical records prior to the Preakness; conditions that Medina Spirit met successfully.

In the first week of May, trainer Brad Cox stated that Mandaloun, who had finished second in the Derby and stood to be declared the winner upon a disqualification of Medina Spirit, would bypass the Preakness. Essential Quality, who had been the favorite in the Derby before finishing fourth, was also ruled out of the Preakness. In their absence, the main rival to Medina Spirit was expected to be his stablemate, Concert Tour, who had won two stakes races but finished third in his most recent start in the Arkansas Derby. Midnight Bourbon was expected to be the third betting choice based on his sixth place finish in the Derby, second place finish in the Louisiana Derby and win in the Lecomte Stakes.

The post-position draw was held on May 11. At the time the race was run, the top betting favorites were Medina Spirit, Midnight Bourbon, and Concert Tour in that order.

At post time, Midnight Bourbon and Medina Spirit went off as co-betting favorites each at 5-2.

Result

Source:

Payout

 $1 Exacta (6–5) $49.30
 $1 Trifecta (6–5–3) $162.70
 $1 Superfecta (6–5–3–2) $1,025.50
 $1 Super High Five (6–5–3–2–4) $4,857.80

Source:

Times:  mile – 0:23.77;   mile – 0:46.93;  mile – 1:10.97; mile – 1:34.78;  final – 1:53.62.
Splits for each quarter-mile: (:23.77) (:23.16) (:24.04) (:23.81) (:18.84 for final )

References

External links 
 
 Preakness Stakes 2021 (Full Race) from NBC Sports via YouTube

2021
2021 in horse racing
2021 in American sports
May 2021 sports events in the United States
Horse races in Maryland
2021 in sports in Maryland